Calotes farooqi, Farooq's garden lizard, is a species of agamid lizard. It is endemic to Pakistan.

References

Calotes
Reptiles of Pakistan
Endemic fauna of Pakistan
Reptiles described in 1995